"Friend" is a 2004 song by Fleetwood Mac's keyboardist and vocalist Christine McVie from her album In the Meantime. The song was written by McVie, Robbie Patton, George Hawkins, and McVie's nephew Dan Perfect. The song reached No. 29 on the Billboard Adult Contemporary chart in 2004.

Personnel
Christine McVie – vocals, keyboards, synthesizer
Dan Perfect – guitars
George Hawkins – bass guitar, backing vocals
Steve Ferrone – drums
Luis Conte – percussion

Charts

References

Songs written by Christine McVie
2004 songs
2004 singles
Songs written by Robbie Patton
Christine_McVie songs
Warner Records singles